Kalabagan is a Thana in Dhaka, Bangladesh, adjacent to Dhanmondi and Jatiya Sangsad.

Geography 
Kalabagan has an area of 1.26 km2.

Demographics 
According to the 2001 Bangladesh census there are about 106671 people living in Kalabagan.

Education 
There are many educational institutions located in kalabagan thana like Hamdard Public College and Dhaka Public College.

Establishments 
 Kalabagan Cricket Academy
 Kala Bagan Krira Chakra

References 

Thanas of Dhaka